Anne Margaret Cohen (born 2 January 1941) is a former Australian politician. She was the Liberal member for Minchinbury and then Badgerys Creek from 1988 to 1995.

Cohen was born in Inverell in New South Wales, and was an editor and small business owner before entering politics. Married to Richard, she has two children. In 1988, she was selected as the Liberal candidate for the new notionally Labor seat of Minchinbury; she had a narrow win. In 1991 Minchinbury was replaced by Badgerys Creek, which Cohen also won. Shortly after that election she became Chief Secretary and Minister for Administrative Services. She was the last Chief Secretary of New South Wales, with the office being abolished in 1995.
In 1995, she was very narrowly defeated by Labor candidate Diane Beamer.

Later in 1995 she attempted to return to the NSW Parliament via a vacancy in the Legislative Council caused by the resignation of Stephen Mutch  but was defeated in the preselection by Mike Gallacher.

References

 

1941 births
Living people
Liberal Party of Australia members of the Parliament of New South Wales
Members of the New South Wales Legislative Assembly
Women members of the New South Wales Legislative Assembly